The 2021 Mountain West Conference women's soccer tournament was the postseason women's soccer tournament for the Mountain West Conference held from November 1 through November 6, 2021. The five-match tournament took place at Boas Tennis/Soccer Complex in Boise, Idaho. The six-team single-elimination tournament consisted of three rounds based on seeding from regular season conference play. Boise State won the tournament in 2019 and are classified as the defending champions because there was no tournament held in 2020 due to the COVID-19 pandemic.  New Mexico were the regular season champions in 2020.  Boise State was unable to defend their crown, losing to Fresno State on penalties in the Semifinals.  New Mexico then defeated Fresno State in the finals 2–1 to win the title.  This was the second tournament championship for New Mexico, their first since 2011.  It was the first title for head coach Rob Baarts. As tournament champions, New Mexico earned the Mountain West's automatic berth into the 2021 NCAA Division I Women's Soccer Tournament.

Seeding 

The top six teams from regular season play qualified for the 2021 Tournament.  Teams were seeded based on their regular season records.  Tiebreakers were used to determine seeds if teams were tied on regular season record.  San Diego State and Utah State tied for third in the regular season standings.  San Diego State earned the third seed in the tournament by virtue of their 2–0 win over Utah State on October 3.  Boise State and Colorado College tied for sixth during the regular season and the final tournament spot.  The teams tied their regular season match-up on October 14.  Boise State won the second tiebreaker and earned the final spot in the tournament.

Bracket

Source:

Schedule

Quarterfinals

Semifinals

Final

Statistics

Goalscorers

All-Tournament team

Source:

MVP in bold

References

Mountain West Conference Women's Soccer Tournament
2021 Mountain West Conference women's soccer season